The Men's 200 metre individual medley SM13 swimming event at the 2004 Summer Paralympics was competed on 24 September. It was won by Daniel Clausner, representing .

1st round

Heat 1
24 Sept. 2004, morning session

Heat 2
24 Sept. 2004, morning session

Final round

24 Sept. 2004, evening session

References

M